Ivano-Frankivsk International Airport (Ukrainian Міжнародний аеропорт Івано-Франківськ)  is an airport in Ivano-Frankivsk, Ukraine, some 4.4 km (2.7 mi) by road from the town center.

Overview
Ivano-Frankivsk airport is an international airport and has maintained border and customs operations since 1992. The airport is located at the site of the former village of Opryshivtsi. Its traffic capacity is claimed to be 400 passengers per hour. Officials have made efforts in the past to promote the airport and its relative proximity to the Bukovel ski area, Vorokhta and the Carpathian National Nature Park, and other quiet, spectacular mountain environments.

It is a joint military-civil airfield. A second concrete runway, 6,325 ft (1,928 m) long, is now used by the military as a parking lot, and a large apron (located northwest of the civilian terminal) is still in use by the Ukrainian Air Force (the 114th Tactical Aviation Brigade is based at the airfield and has Mikoyan MiG-29 fighter jets).

The base was also home to the:
 277th Mlavskiy Red Banner Bomber Aviation Regiment between 1950 and May 1954.

On 24 February 2022, Ukraine closed its airspace to civilian flights due to the Russian invasion. The base was airstriked and significantly damaged by Russian armed forces at dawn on 11 March 2022 during the Russian invasion of Ukraine.

Airlines and destinations

The following airlines operate regular scheduled and charter flights at the airport:

As of 24 February 2022, all passenger flights have been suspended indefinitely.

Statistics

See also
 List of airports in Ukraine
 List of the busiest airports in Ukraine
 List of the busiest airports in Europe
 List of the busiest airports in the former USSR

References

External links

Ivano-Frankivsk International Airport 
 Airport data
Кий авіа: Airport directory
(US) National Weather Service: current weather observations at UKLI/IFO
 Updated weather forecasts
Aviation Safety: Accident history for UKLI
Airliners.net: Caption of Ivano-Frankivsk passenger terminal
 “Anti-monopoly Committee” about Ivano-Frankivsk Airport's and oblast's policies

Airports in Ukraine
Buildings and structures in Ivano-Frankivsk
Ukrainian airbases
Buildings and structures destroyed during the 2022 Russian invasion of Ukraine